Raftaar (Speed) is a 1975 Bollywood action drama film directed by Dinesh-Ramanesh and produced by S. I. Shivdasani. Its music was composed by the music directing duo Sonik Omi. The story writer was Rajvansh, while screenplay and dialogues were by K. B. Pathak. The lyricists were Verma Malik, Omkar Verma and Abhilash. Vinod Mehra was cast in the main role as Vikram. Mehra had started his career in Roop K. Shorey's Ek Thi Reeta (1971) and became an established star following Anuraag (1973); Raftaar was noted as one of his prominent films in the 1970s. The cast included Moushumi Chatterjee, Danny Denzongpa, Madan Puri, Ranjeet, Arpana Chowdhary and Jankidas.

Raftaar was a romantic action thriller film with drama. It involves a young city man sent to a village to work. He falls in love with a village girl who dies, but mysteriously reappears in his life under another identity.

The film was given a three star rating, with its music by Sonik Omi cited as being "good".

Plot
Rani (Moushumi Chatterjee) is a village girl living with her ever-grumbling step-mother (Lalita Kumari) and father (Jankidas). At the start of the film, she is shown playing kabaddi with other girls. They trouble the village simpleton Banelal (Birbal) and are reprimanded by his father (Sunder). While trying to get water from the village well, Rani slips and falls inside. Vikram (Vinod Mehra), who works for Pramod Kumar (Danny Denzongpa) as a manager is sent to the village to get some job done. He stops to fill water in his car, which has heated up and helps Rani by pulling her out of the well. Vikram falls in love with her and promises to marry her when he saves her from committing suicide to avoid an arranged marriage.

Kumar arrives at the village and demands that his housekeeper to get Rani for him. He sends Vikram to the city on some pretext and rapes Rani. Rani is seen jumping into the river by the housekeeper. However, she is saved by a kind-hearted Christian gentleman Jackson (Madan Puri), who has lost his daughter, Rita, several years ago.

Vikram gets implicated in some wrongdoing and is sent to prison for a year. On his return, he finds Kumar attempting to rape another girl and gets hurt in the fight. He is found unconscious by some gypsies who care for him. He then helps a young woman, Radha (Arpana Chaudhary) and her child, in search of her husband, and shifts to the city. Kumar spots Rani who is now pretending to be Rita and discovers her identity when he hears her sing at a function.

Rita/Rani is after revenge and pretends to be friendly with Kumar. Following some fight scenes and melodramatic moments, Kumar repents when he finds he has a son, and goes to jail. Vikram and Rani get together.

Cast

Vinod Mehra as Vikram
Moushumi Chatterjee as Rani / Rita
Danny Denzongpa as Pramod Kumar
Ranjeet as Chandu Banjara
Madan Puri as Jackson (Rita's Father)
Sunder as Bankelal's Father
Mohan Choti as Sakharam 
Birbal as Bankelal
Jankidas as Rani's Father
Lalita Kumari as Rani's Step-mother
Arpana Choudhary as Radha (Pramod's Wife)

Soundtrack
The music composers were Sonik Omi. The songs were written by three lyricists, Verma Malik, Omkar Verma and Abhilash, with playback singing provided by Asha Bhosle, Mohammed Rafi and Mukesh. The film had one of the rare duets by Mukesh and Asha Bhosle "Sansar Hai Ek Nadiya", picturised on Madan Puri and Moushumi Chatterjee. "Main Teri Heer Hoon, Teri Taqdeer Hoon" by Mohammed Rafi and Asha Bhosle is also considered as one of the gems with superb music by Sonik Omi.

Song list

References

External links
 

1975 films
Films scored by Sonik-Omi
1970s Hindi-language films
1970s action drama films
1975 drama films